Kent Douglas Vosler (born December 6, 1955) from Eaton, Ohio is an American former diver. He was born in Dayton, Ohio. Vosler competed in the 1976 Summer Olympics, where he placed 4th in the men's 10 metre platform. At the 1975 Pan American Games he won a bronze medal in the 10 m platform. At the 1977 Summer Universiade he won a gold medal in the 10 m platform.

References

1955 births
Living people
Sportspeople from Dayton, Ohio
Olympic divers of the United States
Divers at the 1976 Summer Olympics
American male divers
Pan American Games bronze medalists for the United States
Pan American Games medalists in diving
Universiade medalists in diving
Divers at the 1975 Pan American Games
People from Eaton, Ohio
Universiade gold medalists for the United States
Medalists at the 1977 Summer Universiade
Medalists at the 1975 Pan American Games